This is a list of notable companies in the information technology sector based in India. Top Indian companies are listed in descending order of their market capitalization, and other companies are listed alphabetically, grouped by the cities in which they are headquartered. Certain companies have main offices in more than one city, in which case they are listed under each, but minor offices and resources are not listed. Foreign companies that have large presence in India are also included. There are IT companies of Indian origin but headquartered in US and other countries. Several foreign companies have more employees in India than their parent countries.

Top Indian companies

Other companies

See also
 List of IT consulting firms

References 

IT
 
 list
IT